Margarita López is a former member of the New York City Council who represented New York City's 2nd City Council district from 1998 to 2005. The 2nd district comprises the Lower East Side, Alphabet City, and the East Village. López was elected to the Council in 1997. Born in Puerto Rico, she relocated to New York City in 1978. A Democrat, she was the only openly gay Puerto Rican politician on the City Council for some time.  During her years of political service, she has particularly emphasized increasing city services, renovating neighborhood libraries, and championing gay, lesbian, bisexual and transgender rights.

In 2005, López entered the race to succeed C. Virginia Fields as Manhattan Borough President. Due to a series of articles published in the New York Post,  she came under fire for connections to the controversial Church of Scientology, whose members donated sizeable amounts of money to her campaign.  Due at least in part to the bad press generated by these stories and the Church of Scientology's views on homosexuality, she lost the Democratic primary election to win her party's endorsement for the general election in November of that year. Democratic candidate Scott Stringer won both the primary and later the general election.

In 2006, Mayor Michael Bloomberg appointed López to a seat on the board of the New York City Housing Authority. López, who once was a critic of Bloomberg, endorsed the mayor in his re-election campaign against Fernando Ferrer, the second Puerto Rican politician to run for mayor of the city (Herman Badillo was the first). She was succeeded in her previous councilmember position by Rosie Méndez.

See also
 LGBT culture in New York City
 List of LGBT people from New York City
 Nuyorican
 Puerto Ricans in New York City

References

External links
 Interview with New York Latino Journal
  Campaign endorsement from Stonewall Democrats

Activists from New York City
American politicians of Puerto Rican descent
Puerto Rican people in New York (state) politics
Hispanic and Latino American women in politics
Lesbian politicians
American LGBT city council members
LGBT people from New York (state)
Puerto Rican LGBT people
American LGBT rights activists
Living people
New York City Council members
Hispanic and Latino American New York City Council members
Women New York City Council members
New York (state) Democrats
People from San Juan, Puerto Rico
Year of birth missing (living people)